Sawyer were a group originally formed in Fife, Scotland in 1990 by John Mackie (vocals), Andrew Hunter (bass), Alan Findlay (drums) & Iain Hinchliffe (guitar). With this line-up they recorded a double 7" single for Human Condition Records of Edinburgh, operated by Jamie Watson (of Chamber Studios).

History
Sawyer were started by Andrew Hunter and John Mackie who then asked Iain Hinchliffe, of Fife band The Schoolhouse, and Alan Findlay, from Silent Falls and Supernova, to get together. After a double 7" EP and a line-up change, replacing Andrew Hunter with Alan Wilson on bass and adding Derek Anderson on guitar, Sawyer recorded an album called On The Seven, also released on Human Condition.

Sawyer went on long-term hiatus in 2000 following guitarist Iain H’s move to London for work. Iain H now plays in Part Chimp, Alan Findlay played drums in Mute records artists Foil, Derek Anderson plays in Scotland's premier Police tribute "The Polis" & "Harlot", and Alan Wilson plays guitar in 13 Tombs.

The band members came together again to perform in June 2013, at Electric Circus in Edinburgh, as part of a tribute night to the former venue Cas Rock.

Discography
Ghetty Chasun (Double 7" ep)  (1994) - Human Condition Records
Air Freshener (Compilation CD) - Earwing Records
On The Seven (CD) - (2000) Human Condition Records
Handbags At Dawn (Compilation CD) - Human Condition Records

References

External links
Sawyer on Discogs
Earwing Records website
Part Chimp website
Human Condition Records website

Scottish rock music groups